Qaleh-ye Najaf Ali Khan (also Romanized as Qal‘eh-ye Najaf ‘Alī Khān) is a village in Mahidasht Rural District, Mahidasht District, Kermanshah County, Kermanshah Province, Iran. At the 2006 census, its population was 376, in 86 families.

References 

Populated places in Kermanshah County